Clinesmith is a surname.  Notable people with the surname include:

 Kevin Clinesmith (born 1984), former FBI lawyer convicted in Crossfire Hurricane investigation
 Stacy Clinesmith (born 1978), American basketball player and coach